Captain Underpants: The First Epic Movie is a 2017 American computer-animated superhero comedy film based on Dav Pilkey's children's novel series of the same name, produced by DreamWorks Animation and the last DreamWorks movie to be distributed by 20th Century Fox. It was directed by David Soren from a screenplay by Nicholas Stoller, and stars the voices of Kevin Hart, Ed Helms, Thomas Middleditch and Nick Kroll. The film marked the 20th anniversary of the Captain Underpants series. In the film, two fourth graders, George Beard and Harold Hutchins accidentally hypnotize their mean principal, Mr. Krupp, into thinking he is the titular "Captain Underpants", a superhero who fights crime while wearing only underwear and a cape, thinking he has superpowers. The movie loosely adapts the first, second, and fourth Captain Underpants books.

Captain Underpants: The First Epic Movie premiered on May 21, 2017, at the Regency Village Theater in Los Angeles, and was released in the United States on June 2, in 3D and 2D formats. The film received generally positive reviews, with critics praising the animation, humor, faithfulness and references to its source material, and voice acting, particularly from Helms. It grossed $125 million worldwide against a budget of $38 million, the lowest budget for a DreamWorks Animation feature film until Spirit Untamed was released in 2021 at a budget of $30 million. A Netflix television series, The Epic Tales of Captain Underpants was released on July 13, 2018, having aired 4 seasons with 45 episodes and 3 specials so far. A spin-off film based on Dog Man, another book series by Pilkey, has been announced in late 2020.

Plot

In Piqua, Ohio, George Beard and Harold Hutchins are two fourth-grade friends and next-door neighbors who often bring joy to their school, Jerome Horwitz Elementary School, by excessively pranking the staff at the school, especially their cruel principal, Mr. Benjamin "Benny" Krupp, which puts them at odds with him. The duo also creates comic books about a superhero named Captain Underpants, a character who has superpowers yet merely wears underwear and a cape. They sell these to their schoolmates through a comic company called "Treehouse Comix Inc.", located in their treehouse. George and Harold's pranks come to an apparent end when they are caught tampering with a toilet invention, the Turbo Toilet 2000, made by their tattletale classmate, Melvin Sneedly. Mr. Krupp decides to put the boys in separate classes, believing that he can end their friendship with it.

To prevent this, George hypnotizes Mr. Krupp with a "3-D Hypno-Ring" he received out of a cereal box. As the boys have noticed that Mr. Krupp bears a resemblance to Captain Underpants, they command him to be so. The boys soon learn the severity of this when Captain Underpants begins causing trouble around Piqua and thus decide to take him to their treehouse. There, they discover that they can turn Captain Underpants back into Mr. Krupp by splashing water on him and back into Captain Underpants by snapping their fingers. Realizing that Mr. Krupp will continue trying to separate them, they decide to settle with Captain Underpants yet insist that he be dressed up as Mr. Krupp under the pretense of a "secret identity", to which Captain Underpants agrees. His sudden personality change even manages to attract the attention and affection of the school's shy lunch lady, Edith.

Just when George and Harold believe that their troubles have ended, an odd scientist named Professor Pee-Pee Diarrheastein Poopypants Esq. visits Jerome Horwitz Elementary School, whom Captain Underpants (still disguised as Mr. Krupp) hires to be the new science teacher, but George and Harold are suspicious due to his short-tempered and violent behavior. As it turns out, Poopypants is seeking to get rid of laughter altogether due to people never taking him seriously because of his name.

With Captain Underpants as the principal, the school is a more lively place, with a fair being set up in the yard. However, a rainstorm occurs and Captain Underpants turns back into Mr. Krupp, who finally finishes the paperwork to put George and Harold into separate classes. Meanwhile, Poopypants recruits Melvin into his plan, as he has no sense of humor and does not find his name funny. Soon, Poopypants tries to take over the town with a giant version of Melvin's Turbo Toilet 2000, fueled by the school cafeteria's toxic leftovers left out by Edith, and uses Melvin's brain as the power source to a zombie-ray to turn the children into dull and humorless zombies. Captain Underpants tries to stop them, but due to having no actual superpowers, he's effortlessly defeated and thrown into the toxic pool. George and Harold are captured and turned into zombies but are able to escape when their laughter from a joke that made them friends in kindergarten overloads the zombie-ray, which damages the Turbo Toilet 2000's computer and returns the kids to normal. Upon consuming the toxic leftovers, Captain Underpants acquires superpowers and, with George and Harold's help, defeats and shrinks Poopypants, who escapes on a bee shortly thereafter.

Knowing that they can't control Captain Underpants forever, George and Harold destroy the Hypno Ring in order to permanently change him back into Mr. Krupp. Also realizing that they can still be best friends while being in separate classes, the boys take an oath to declare themselves as friends forever. Feeling that Mr. Krupp would be a lot nicer if he had friends, the boys set him and Edith up on a date, making Mr. Krupp have a change of heart and return the comics he confiscated from George and Harold. However, the toxic waste from the Turbo Toilet 2000 transforms all the toilets at a scrap yard into an army of Talking Toilets, which attack the restaurant where Mr. Krupp and Edith are dining. Upon snapping his fingers accidentally, Mr. Krupp once again becomes Captain Underpants, carrying George and Harold away to help them fight the Toilets to Edith's surprise and admiration.

Voice cast
 Ed Helms as Mr. Benjamin "Benny" Krupp / Captain Underpants, the grumpy and mean principal of Jerome Horwitz Elementary School, who gets hypnotized into becoming the superhero created by George and Harold, in order to stop him from putting them in separate classes.
 Kevin Hart as George Beard, a fourth-grade student who is best friends with Harold who make comic books, George writes stories while Harold illustrates them. George is typically calmer in tough situations.
 Thomas Middleditch as Harold Hutchins, a fourth-grade student who is best friends with George. Harold illustrates books while George writes the stories. Harold is cautious and worrisome in tough situations. Harold is friendly with a fondness for dolphins
 Nick Kroll as Professor Pee-Pee Diahreeahstein Poopypants Esquire, a ruthless and humorless German-accented mad scientist and the film's antagonist, who plots to take over the world to get rid of all laughter after years of being constantly disparaged for his name.
 Jordan Peele as Melvin Sneedly, George and Harold's nerdy enemy, and a child prodigy who becomes Professor Poopypants' sidekick due to his lack of a sense of humor.
 Kristen Schaal as Edith, the shy school lunch lady and the love interest of Mr Krupp who was created exclusively for this film, partially based on the book series character of the secretary Miss Edith Anthrope, who is separately featured in the film in a minor capacity.
 Grey Griffin as Miss Anthrope, the school's secretary who was on hold at the phone through the whole film because George and Harold trick her that she'll win a billion dollars so they can sneak inside Mr. Krupp's office.
 Dee Dee Rescher as Ms. Ribble, a 4th-grade teacher (and George's new teacher when Mr. Krupp separates the boys).
 Brian Posehn as Mr. Rected, the guidance counselor (and Harold's new teacher when Mr. Krupp separates the boys).
 Mel Rodriguez as Mr. Fyde, the science teacher who gets fired by Mr. Krupp and is replaced by Professor Poopypants.
 David Soren as Tommy, a boy who is seen frequently throughout the movie climbing into his own locker and shutting the locker door behind him.
 Susan Fitzker as Mrs. Dayken, George and Harold's kindergarten teacher who unintentionally made them laugh by mentioning Uranus.
 Lynnanne Zager as Mrs. Beard, George's mother. In the movie, only her legs are seen, unlike in the books and the Netflix Original series.
 Tiffany Lauren Bennicke as Sad Girl
 James Ryan as Mime, who Captain Underpants accidentally hit in the face to "free" him, after discovering that he is "trapped in an invisible box-like prison".
 Leslie David Baker as Officer McPiggly, a police officer who confronts Captain Underpants after he stops a bank robbery.
 Sugar Lyn Beard as Goody Two-Shoes Girl
 Lesley Nicol as a Nobel Moderator
 Chris Miller as a Nobel Audience Member
 Coco Soren as Balloon Girl

Non-speaking characters
 Mr Kenny Brain Meaner, the school's gym teacher and coach of its football team.
 Ms Singerbrains, the school's librarian.
 Mr Rustworthy, the school's music teacher.

Production
DreamWorks' interest in the film rights to the Captain Underpants series dates back to when the first installment was published in 1997, but creator Dav Pilkey did not want to sell them. Early pitches for an adaptation included video games, animated and live-action films, an animated series, and a live-action series. To persuade him, DreamWorks gave Pilkey a tour around the studio with everyone wearing underpants over their trousers, which made him laugh. In October 2011, his representatives indicated Pilkey was ready, and DreamWorks Animation won the rights in an auction. In October 2013, Rob Letterman was announced as director and Nicholas Stoller as scriptwriter. The two had previously worked together on the film Gulliver's Travels. In January 2014, the cast was announced. Ed Helms joined as Mr Krupp a.k.a. Captain Underpants, Kevin Hart as George Beard, Thomas Middleditch as Harold Hutchins, Nick Kroll as the "insidious villain" Professor Poopypants, and Jordan Peele as George and Harold's "nerdy nemesis" Melvin Sneedly.

In 2014, DreamWorks Animation announced a January 2017 release date. Following DreamWorks Animation's reorganization in early 2015, the studio announced that the film would be produced outside of the studio's pipeline at a significantly lower cost. It was instead animated at Mikros Image in Montreal, Canada, and at Technicolor Animation Productions in France, and therefore looks identical to Pilkey's original drawing style, as well as differently than most of DWA's films. A month later, Letterman left the project but came back as an executive producer, and David Soren, the director of Turbo, entered talks to direct the film.

During production, Pilkey got to work closely with Soren. He was relieved that Soren was directing since he was a fan of Turbo. In an interview with Los Angeles Times, Pilkey said: "Once I met David, it was like a huge load fell off my back; I was like, 'I don't even have to think about this anymore. Just send me a couple of tickets to the premiere.'" Commenting back, Soren said, "In a way, the controversy over the books ended up being liberating for the film. Normally on an animated movie, you're trying to appeal to every possible demographic, and often that results in your content being watered down a little bit. Obviously, we hope we get as wide of an audience as possible. But it's likely that if people have issues with the books they may have issues with the movie too, and we didn't feel like we needed to waste a lot of time trying to rope them in. It allowed us to make the purest version of the movie." Soren also said that he took inspiration from John Hughes films. In an interview with MovieFreak, he mentioned,

Although it is a CG-animated feature, the film includes scenes that are traditionally animated, flash animated, a short cutout animation segment, and a sock puppet sequence created by Screen Novelties.

Music

Soundtrack
"Weird Al" Yankovic wrote and performed the theme song for the film (which is possibly because in the book, George and Harold "play "Weird Al" Yankovic music 6 hours full blast"), which was featured in a lyric video. Andy Grammer wrote another original song for the film, titled "A Friend Like You". The film also features music from Adam Lambert, Cold War Kids member Nathan Willett, and Lil Yachty. An 11-track soundtrack album was released digitally on June 2, 2017, by Virgin Records and Deep Well Records.

Track listing

Score
The film score was composed by Theodore Shapiro. A soundtrack for the score of the film was released on June 9. It features 24 pieces of music, and an exclusive digital booklet on iTunes. Three of the scores are also available on the soundtrack (those being "Comic Book Opening", "Saving the Day", and "The Prank for Good").

Release

Theatrical
Captain Underpants: The First Epic Movie was previously scheduled to be released on March 10, 2017, but in September 2015, The Boss Baby took over its date. The film was then moved to June 2, 2017, and was released by 20th Century Fox. Other territories such as Europe and Asia received the film between July and October 2017. It premiered on May 21, 2017, at the Regency Village Theater in Los Angeles. The film was chosen along with Sony Pictures Animation's The Emoji Movie to inaugurate the removal of Saudi Arabia's cinema ban through a double feature screening on January 13, 2018, organized by Cinema 70; they were the first two movies to be given an official public screening in the country in 35 years.

Home media
Captain Underpants: The First Epic Movie was released on Digital HD on August 29, 2017, and on DVD, Blu-ray and Ultra HD Blu-ray on September 12, 2017, by 20th Century Fox Home Entertainment, and has been released by Universal Pictures Home Entertainment in certain territories. From January 2018 to July 2019, the film is available on Netflix, the film is expected to return to the streaming platform after 4 years on July 10, 2023.

Reception

Box office
Captain Underpants: The First Epic Movie grossed $73.9 million in the United States and Canada and $51.6 million in other territories, for a worldwide gross of $125.5 million, against a production budget of $38 million.

In North America, the film was released alongside Wonder Woman, and was projected to gross around $20 million from 3,434 theaters in its opening weekend. It made $8 million on its first day and $23.9 million in its opening weekend, finishing second at the box office, behind Wonder Woman ($103.3 million). The film grossed $12.2 million in its second weekend, $7.2 million in its third and $4.3 million in its fourth.

Critical response
The site's critical consensus reads, "With a tidy plot, clean animation, and humor that fits its source material snugly, Captain Underpants: The First Epic Movie is entertainment that won't drive a wedge between family members." On Metacritic, the film has a score of 70 out of 100 based on 25 critics, indicating "generally favorable reviews". Audiences polled by CinemaScore gave the film an average grade of "B+" on an A+ to F scale.

Matt Zoller Seitz of RogerEbert.com gave the film three-and-a-half out of four stars. Although Seitz pointed out that the film is hampered by "a rushed, jumbled quality" and has "tiresome" features that he says are common to DreamWorks, such as "frenetic action scenes ... and the use of workhorse pop songs", he emphasized that "[t]hey've approached this compendium of elemental slapstick and unabashed childishness with the reverence that the Coen brothers brought to No Country for Old Men." He further added that the inclusion of the flipbook interludes are the film's best parts, especially in having the pages accidentally be torn similar to the real books, stating that "[i]t's not often that a movie puts a spotlight on a mundane ritual in your own life that you never realized was profound and says, 'You probably forgot about this, but I want you to remember it and savor it because it meant something.'"

Accolades

Television series

On December 12, 2017, Netflix and DreamWorks Animation Television announced that there would be an animated series to follow-up the film, entitled The Epic Tales of Captain Underpants. It premiered on the streaming service on July 13, 2018, and is executive-produced by Peter Hastings.

Spin-off film
On December 9, 2020, DreamWorks Animation announced that a feature film adaptation of Dog Man (another one of George and Harold's comic creations) is currently in the works by director Peter Hastings, the showrunner for The Epic Tales of Captain Underpants.

References

Further reading

External links

 
 
 

2017 films
2017 3D films
2017 action comedy films
2017 computer-animated films
2010s American animated films
2010s children's comedy films
2010s children's animated films
2010s action comedy films
2010s superhero comedy films
2010s animated superhero films
2010s English-language films
American 3D films
American computer-animated films
American children's animated action films
American children's animated comedy films
American children's animated superhero films
American action comedy films
American slapstick comedy films
American superhero comedy films
American films with live action and animation
Animated superhero comedy films
Surreal comedy films
Self-reflexive films
Puppet films
First Epic Movie, The
3D animated films
Animated films based on American novels
Animated films based on children's books
Films adapted into television shows
Animated films about children
Films about educators
Films about hypnosis
Animated films about friendship
Animated films about revenge
Films about size change
Films set in Ohio
Films set in schools
Films directed by David Soren (animator)
Films with screenplays by Nicholas Stoller
Films scored by Theodore Shapiro
20th Century Fox films
20th Century Fox animated films
DreamWorks Animation animated films